Rafael Assis da Cruz Rodrigues (born 2 April 1993), known as Rafael Assis, is a Brazilian football player who plays for Náutico.

Club career
He made his professional debut in the Campeonato Mineiro for Tupi on 2 February 2013 in a game against Villa Nova.

References

External links
 

1993 births
Sportspeople from Minas Gerais
Living people
Brazilian footballers
Tupi Football Club players
FC Istres players
Brazilian expatriate footballers
Expatriate footballers in France
Ligue 2 players
Clube Esportivo Bento Gonçalves players
Associação Atlética Caldense players
Anápolis Futebol Clube players
A.D. Sanjoanense players
Expatriate footballers in Portugal
Association football forwards